Charlie Terrence Cooper (born 1 May 1997) is an English professional footballer who plays as a central midfielder, for  club Yeovil Town.

Cooper began his career with Birmingham City, but never played for their first team. He spent time on loan at National League clubs York City and Forest Green Rovers before joining the latter on a permanent basis in 2017 after their promotion to the Football League. In 2018–19, he spent time on loan at League Two club Newport County and Boreham Wood of the National League. Cooper subsequently spent seasons with National League clubs FC Halifax Town, scoring once from 31 appearances, Woking and Wealdstone, before joining Oldham Athletic in 2022.

Life and career

Early life and career
Cooper is the son of former footballer Mark Cooper and grandson of England international Terry Cooper. He was born in Stockton-on-Tees, County Durham, while his father was a Hartlepool United player. The family later moved to the Midlands, where Cooper attended Alderbrook School in Solihull. He was noticed by representatives of Birmingham City when playing in a cup final, and joined their Academy in 2007. He took up a scholarship with the club in July 2013. Interviewed in early 2014, he assessed his strength as passing, and felt he needed to improve his heading.

Cooper signed his first professional contract, of two years, in May 2015. According to coach Steve Spooner, "Charlie is like the conductor of the orchestra; he sets the tone. He's learnt how to slow games down and speed games up. His range of passing has improved, as well as his goal scoring. And I think there is more to come from him in that area."

National League football
Cooper joined National League club Forest Green Rovers on a month's youth loan on 23 January 2016. He was an unused substitute for four matches before Birmingham recalled him. He was a member of the Birmingham reserve team that lost the 2016 Birmingham Senior Cup final to National League North champions Solihull Moors.

On 26 October of the following season, he was loaned to another National League club, this time York City. He went straight into the starting eleven for the next match, at home to Sutton United. According to Dave Flett of the York Press, Cooper "introduced some much-needed forward thrust" to the midfield as the match ended 2–2. He started four more matches, all in the league, before returning to Birmingham after one month.

On 9 December, Cooper rejoined Forest Green Roverswho were by that time under his father's managementfor another month. After he made five appearances during the month, Birmingham allowed the loan to be extended to the end of the season. He was a regular starter throughout his loan spell, and helped the club gain promotion to the Football League for the first time in the club's history.

League football with Forest Green Rovers
Birmingham had confirmed in March that Cooper would be released when his contract expired at the end of the season, and he signed a two-year contract with Forest Green on 15 June 2017. He made his Football League debut on the opening day of the 2017–18 season, in the starting eleven for the League Two visit of Barnet to The New Lawn. He took the corner kick from which Christian Doidge headed Forest Green's first Football League goal, and played the whole of the match, which finished 2–2. Cooper scored his first senior goal on 19 August, contributing Forest Green's third goal with a "speculative strike" as his team came back from 2–0 and 3–1 down to beat Yeovil Town 4–3 and record their first win in the Football League. He established himself as a regular in the midfield, until knee damage, diagnosed as hyperextension of his left knee and bruising to the bone, sustained following a tackle in a match against Coventry City in mid-October, kept him out for six weeks. He returned to the side as a second-half substitute in an EFL Trophy match on 5 December, and then resumed his place in the starting eleven.

Cooper joined Forest Green's League Two rivals Newport County on 22 June 2018 on loan for the 2018–19 season. He made his Newport debut on the opening day of the season, as a second-half substitute in a 3–0 defeat at Mansfield Town. He made 15 appearances in all competitions without scoring before his loan was ended early on 13 December. In mid-March 2019, he went out on loan to National League club Boreham Wood, finishing the season with five appearances.

Return to the National League
Forest Green took up their option to retain Cooper's services for the 2019–20 season, but cancelled his contract by mutual consent in August. He had trained with Bury, but a potential contract fell through after the club was expelled from the EFL. On 12 September 2019, Cooper signed for National League club FC Halifax Town.

On 5 September 2020, Cooper agreed to make the switch to fellow National League side, Woking, on a one-year deal. Cooper made a total of 46 appearances, netting 4 times for the Cards before departing the club at the end of the season.

On 11 August 2021, it was announced that Cooper had signed a one-year contract with another National League club, Wealdstone. His debut came a week later, in a 2–1 defeat to his former club, Woking. His first goal for Wealdstone, scored from the edge of the penalty area, proved to be the decider away to King's Lynn Town on 25 September. Cooper scored once more for the club, as a substitute in a 4–2 defeat away to Altrincham, and made 38 appearances in all competitions before leaving at the end of thee season after talks to extend his contract came to nothing.

After a trial, Cooper signed for Oldham Athletic ahead of the 2022–23 season. He left the club in December 2022 when his six-month contract expired.

On 14 January 2023, Cooper signed by his father Mark for fellow National League side Yeovil Town on an 18-month contract.

Career statistics

Honours
Forest Green Rovers
National League play-offs: 2017

References

External links
Profile at the FC Halifax Town website

1997 births
Living people
Footballers from Stockton-on-Tees
Footballers from County Durham
English footballers
Association football midfielders
Birmingham City F.C. players
Forest Green Rovers F.C. players
York City F.C. players
Newport County A.F.C. players
Boreham Wood F.C. players
FC Halifax Town players
Woking F.C. players
Wealdstone F.C. players
Oldham Athletic A.F.C. players
Yeovil Town F.C. players
National League (English football) players
English Football League players